Polynesians form an ethnolinguistic group of closely related people who are native to Polynesia (islands in the Polynesian Triangle), an expansive region of Oceania in the Pacific Ocean. They trace their early prehistoric origins to Island Southeast Asia and form part of the larger  Austronesian ethnolinguistic group with an Urheimat in Taiwan. They speak the Polynesian languages, a branch of the Oceanic subfamily of the Austronesian language family. The Indigenous Māori people constitute the largest  Polynesian population,  followed by Samoans, Native Hawaiians, Tahitians, Tongans and Cook Islands Māori.

 there were an estimated 2 million ethnic Polynesians (full and part) worldwide, the vast majority of whom either inhabit independent Polynesian nation-states (Samoa, Niue, Cook Islands, Tonga, and Tuvalu) or form minorities in countries such as Australia, Chile (Easter Island), New Zealand, France (French Polynesia and Wallis and Futuna), and the United States (Hawaii and American Samoa), in addition to the British Overseas Territory of the Pitcairn Islands. New Zealand had the highest population of Polynesians, estimated at 110,000 in the 18th century.

Polynesians have acquired a reputation as great navigators—their canoes reached the most remote corners of the Pacific, allowing the settlement of islands as far apart as Hawaii, Rapanui (Easter Island) and Aotearoa (New Zealand). The people of Polynesia accomplished this voyaging using ancient navigation skills of reading stars, currents, clouds and bird movements—skills passed to successive generations down to the present day.

Origins 

Polynesians, including Samoans, Tongans, Niueans, Cook Islands Māori, Tahitian Mā'ohi, Hawaiian Māoli, Marquesans and New Zealand Māori, are a subset of the Austronesian peoples. Some share the same origins as the indigenous peoples of Taiwan, Southeast Asia (especially the Philippines, Malaysia and Indonesia), Micronesia, and Madagascar. This is supported by genetic, linguistic and archaeological evidence.

There are multiple hypotheses on the ultimate origin and mode of dispersal of the Austronesian peoples, but the most widely accepted theory is that modern Austronesians originated from migrations out of Taiwan between 3000 and 1000 BC. Using relatively advanced maritime innovations like the catamaran, outrigger boats, and crab claw sails, they rapidly colonized the islands of both the Indian and the Pacific oceans. They were the first humans to cross vast distances of water on ocean-going boats. Polynesians are known to have definitely originated from a branch of the Austronesian migrations in Island Melanesia, despite the popularity of rejected hypotheses like Thor Heyerdahl's belief that Polynesians are descendants of "bearded white men" who sailed on primitive rafts from South America.

The direct ancestors of the Polynesians were the Neolithic Lapita culture, which emerged in Island Melanesia and Micronesia at around 1500 BC from a convergence of migration waves of Austronesians originating from both Island Southeast Asia to the west and an earlier Austronesian migration to Micronesia to the north. The culture was distinguished by distinct dentate-stamped pottery. However, their eastward expansion stopped when they reached the western Polynesian islands of Fiji, Samoa and Tonga by around 900 BC. This remained the furthest extent of the Austronesian expansion in the Pacific for around 1,500 years, during which the Lapita culture in these islands abruptly lost the technology of making pottery for unknown reasons. They resumed their eastward migrations by around 700 AD, spreading to the Cook Islands, French Polynesia, and the Marquesas. From here, they spread further to Hawaii by 900 AD, Easter Island by 1000 AD, and finally New Zealand by 1200 AD.

Genetic studies

Analysis by Kayser et al. (2008) discovered that only 21% of the Polynesian autosomal gene pool is of Australo-Melanesian origin, with the rest (79%) being of Austronesian origin. Another study by Friedlaender et al. (2008) also confirmed that some Polynesians are closer genetically to Micronesians, Taiwanese Aborigines, and Islander Southeast Asians than to Papuans. The study concluded that Polynesians moved through Melanesia fairly rapidly, allowing only limited admixture between Austronesians and Papuans. Polynesians belong almost entirely to the Haplogroup B (mtDNA) especially to mtDNA B4a1a1 (Polynesian motif), and thus the high frequencies of mtDNA B4 in the Polynesians are the result of drift and represent the descendants of a few Austronesian females who mixed with Papuan males. The Polynesian population experienced a founder effect and genetic drift due to the ancestors of Polynesian being very few in numbers.  As a result of founder effect, the Polynesian are distinctively different both genotypically and phenotypically from the parent population from which it is derived. This is due to new population being established by a very small number of individuals from a larger population which also causes a loss of genetic variation.

Soares et al. (2008) have argued for an older pre-Holocene Sundaland origin in Island Southeast Asia (ISEA) based on mitochondrial DNA. The "out of Taiwan model" was challenged by a study from Leeds University and published in Molecular Biology and Evolution. Examination of mitochondrial DNA lineages shows that they have been evolving in ISEA for longer than previously believed. Ancestors of the Polynesians arrived in the Bismarck Archipelago of Papua New Guinea at least 6,000 to 8,000 years ago.

A 2014 study by Lipson et al. using whole genome data supports the findings of Kayser et al. Modern Polynesians were shown to have lower levels of admixture with Australo-Melanesians than Austronesians in Island Melanesia. Regardless, both show admixture, along with other Austronesian populations outside of Taiwan, indicating varying degrees of intermarriage between the incoming Neolithic Austronesian settlers and the preexisting Paleolithic Australo-Melanesian populations of Island Southeast Asia and Melanesia.

Other studies in 2016 and 2017 also support the implications that the earliest Lapita settlers mostly bypassed New Guinea, coming directly from Taiwan or the northern Philippines. The intermarriage and admixture with Australo-Melanesian Papuans evident in the genetics of modern Polynesians (as well as Islander Melanesians) occurred after the settlement of Tonga and Vanuatu.

A 2020 study found that the Polynesians and  the Indigenous peoples of South America, came in contact around 1200, centuries before Europeans interacted with either group.

People

There are an estimated 2 million ethnic Polynesians and many of partial Polynesian descent worldwide, the majority of whom live in Polynesia, the United States, Australia and New Zealand. The Polynesian peoples are shown below in their distinctive ethnic and cultural groupings (estimates of the larger groups are shown):

Polynesia:
 Māori:  New Zealand –  892,200,(not including 170,057 residing in Australia, worldwide: c. 1,062,257)
 Samoan: Samoa, American Samoa –  249,000 (worldwide:  500,000–600,000, including the 109,000 residing in the US and 145,000 in New Zealand)
 Tahitians (Maohi): Tahiti –  178,000 (including multiracial: 250,000+)
 Hawaiians: Hawaii –  140,000 (including multiracial: 400,000)
 Tongan: Tonga –  104,000 (+ 8,000 Australia, 35,000 U.S.A, & 60,300 New Zealand)
 Cook Islands Māori: Cook Islands – 98,000+ (including 62,000 in  New Zealand and 16,000 residing in Australia)
 Niuean: Niue –  20,000–25,000 (95% of whom live in New Zealand)
 Rotuman: Rotuma –  15,000–20,000 (5% reside on Rotuma Island, 75% live on mainland Fiji and 20% live elsewhere (specifically in Australia and New Zealand)
 Tuvaluan: Tuvalu –  10,000 (+ 3,500 in New Zealand)
 Tokelauan: Tokelau –  1,500 (+ 6,500 in New Zealand)
 Tuamotu: Tuamotu Archipelago –  16,000
 Marquesas Islanders: Marquesas Islands –  11,000
 Rapanui: Easter Island –  5,000 (including mixtures and those living in Chile)
 Austral Islanders: Austral Islands – ~7,000
 Mangareva: Gambier Islands –  1,600
 Moriori: Chatham Islands (Rēkohu) –  738 (2013 New Zealand Census)
 Uvea and Futuna: Wallis and Futuna

Polynesian outliers:
 Kapingamarangi and Nukuoro: The Federated States of Micronesia
 Nuguria, Nukumanu and Takuu: Papua New Guinea
 Anuta, Bellona, Ontong Java, Rennel, Sikaiana, Tikopia and Vaeakau-Taumako: Solomon Islands
 Emae, Makata, Mele (Erakoro, Eratapu), Aniwa, and Futuna: Vanuatu
 Fagauvea: Ouvéa (New Caledonia)
 Kioa (500–1000), Fiji

See also

 History of the Polynesian people
 Polynesia
 Polynesian culture
 Polynesian languages
 Polynesian mythology
 Polynesian Society
 Polynesian American
 Pacific Islander
 Taiwanese Aborigines
 Micronesians
 Austronesian peoples
 Melanesians

References

External links
 

Ethnic groups in Oceania
Polynesian people
Indigenous peoples of Polynesia
Ethnic groups in New Zealand
Ethnic groups in the United States
Ethnic groups in Australia
Polynesian Australian
Polynesian New Zealander
Austronesian peoples